The Russian Handball Super League (RHSL) is the top men's professional team handball league in Russia.

In reaction to the 2022 Russian invasion of Ukraine, the International Handball Federation banned Russian and Belarus athletes and officials, and the European Handball Federation suspended the national teams of Russia and Belarus as well as Russian and Belarusian clubs competing in European handball competitions. Referees, officials, and commission members from Russia and Belarus will not be called upon for future activities. And new organisers will be sought for the YAC 16 EHF Beach Handball EURO and the Qualifier Tournaments for the Beach Handball EURO 2023, which were to be held in Moscow.

Champions by year

References

External links
 https://rushandball.ru/competitions

SuperLeague
Russia
Sports leagues in Russia
Professional sports leagues in Russia